NCV may refer to:

 Net calorific value, a synonym for "lower heating value"
 Nerve conduction velocity, a measurement performed in neurophysiological tests
 New Century Version, an English translation of the Christian Bible
 Chinese New Version, formerly known as New Chinese Version, a Chinese translation of the Christian Bible
 N. C. Vasanthakokilam (1919–1951), Indian Carnatic music singer
 North and Central Vanuatu languages, a subgroup of Oceanic languages